Snow White and the Huntsman is a 2012 American fantasy film based on the German fairy tale "Snow White" compiled by the Brothers Grimm. The directorial debut of Rupert Sanders, it was written by Evan Daugherty, John Lee Hancock and Hossein Amini, from a screen story by Daugherty. The cast includes Kristen Stewart, Charlize Theron, Chris Hemsworth, Sam Claflin, and Bob Hoskins in his final film performance. In the film's retelling of the tale, Snow White grows up imprisoned by her evil stepmother, Queen Ravenna, a powerful sorceress. After Snow White escapes into the forest, Ravenna enlists Eric the Huntsman to capture her, but he becomes her companion in a quest to overthrow Ravenna.

Snow White and the Huntsman was theatrically released in the United Kingdom on May 30, 2012 and in the United States on June 1, 2012, by Universal Pictures. The film was a box office success, having grossed $396 million worldwide against a $170 million budget. Critics praised the production design and visual effects, Theron and Hemsworth's performances and the score; action sequences, Stewart and Claflin's performances received mixed reviews while the screenplay was heavily criticized. The film received two Oscar nominations for Best Visual Effects and Best Costume Design at the 85th Academy Awards.

A prequel/sequel, titled The Huntsman: Winter's War, directed by the first film's visual effects supervisor Cedric Nicolas-Troyan, was released on April 22, 2016, with Hemsworth, Theron, Claflin and Nick Frost reprising their roles and new characters being played by Emily Blunt and Jessica Chastain, though Stewart didn't reprise the Snow White character and she appeared in archive footage.

Plot 
While admiring a bright red rose blooming during a white winter, Queen Eleanor of the Kingdom of Tabor pricks her finger on its thorns. Drops of blood fall onto the snow, and she wishes for a daughter with skin as white as snow, lips as red as blood, hair as black as a raven's wings, and a heart as strong as the rose. She gives birth to Snow White but falls ill and dies many years later. After her death, Snow White's father, King Magnus, and his army battle an invading army of glass soldiers. King Magnus finds a prisoner called Ravenna, becomes enchanted with her beauty and marries her.

Ravenna is in fact a powerful sorceress who used the false glass army to charm her way into the kingdom. On their wedding night, she confesses that there was a king much like Magnus that used her, hurt her, then discarded her. She kills Magnus before taking over the kingdom. Snow White's childhood friend William and his father, Duke Hammond, escape but are unable to rescue her, and she is locked away in a tower for years.

Tabor and its people deteriorate under Queen Ravenna’s rule. She periodically drains the youth from the kingdom's young women in order to maintain a spell cast over her as a child by her mother, which allows her to keep her youthful beauty. When her stepdaughter Snow White comes of age, she learns from her Magic Mirror that Snow White is destined to destroy her unless she consumes the girl's heart, which will make her immortal. Ravenna orders her brother Finn to bring her the princess but Snow White escapes into the Dark Forest, where Ravenna has no power. Ravenna makes a bargain with Eric the Huntsman, a widower and drunkard, to capture Snow White, promising to bring his wife back to life in exchange. But when Finn reveals that Ravenna does not actually have the power to revive the dead, the Huntsman helps Snow White escape. The Duke and William learn that Snow White is alive and William leaves the castle to find her, joining Finn's group as a bowman.

Snow White saves the Huntsman's life by charming a troll that attacks them. They make their way to a fishing village populated by women who have disfigured themselves to make themselves useless to Ravenna. The Huntsman learns Snow White's true identity, and leaves her in the care of the women. He returns when he sees the village being burned down by Finn's men. Snow White and the Huntsman evade them and meet a band of eight dwarfs. The blind dwarf Muir perceives that Snow White is the only person who can end Ravenna's reign.

As they travel through a fairy sanctuary, they are attacked by Finn and his men. A battle ensues during which Finn, his men, and one of the dwarfs are killed. William joins the group on their journey to Hammond's castle. Ravenna disguises herself as William and tempts Snow White into eating a poisoned apple before fleeing. William kisses Snow White; though nothing happens, a tear slips out of her eyes. Her body is taken to Hammond's castle. The Huntsman professes his regret for being unable to save her, as her heart and strength remind him of his wife, Sara. He kisses her and does not notice a second tear fall from her eyes, as two kisses of true love breaks the spell. Snow White awakens and rallies the Duke's army to mount a siege against Ravenna.

The dwarfs infiltrate the castle through the sewers and open the gates, allowing the army inside. Snow White and Ravenna fight; Ravenna is about to kill her when Snow White uses a move the Huntsman taught her and stabs Ravenna, defeating her. The kingdom once again enjoys peace as Snow White is crowned the new Queen of Tabor.

Cast

The Dwarfs
The Dwarfs were played by actors of average height who had their faces digitally transmuted onto small bodies. This caused a protest from the Little People of America.

 Ian McShane as Beith, the leader of the Dwarves.
 Bob Hoskins as Muir, the blind elder Dwarf, who possesses the powers of premonition. This was Hoskins's final role before his retirement from acting later in 2012 due to Parkinson's disease, and subsequent death in April 29, 2014.
 Ray Winstone as Gort, an ill-tempered Dwarf.
 Nick Frost as Nion, Beith's right-hand man.
 Toby Jones as Coll, Duir's brother.
 Eddie Marsan as Duir, Coll's brother.
 Johnny Harris as Quert, Muir's son.
 Brian Gleeson as Gus, the youngest of the Dwarfs who develops a bond with Snow White and later sacrifices himself to save her.

Production

Development
Evan Daugherty initially wrote the screenplay in 2003, when he was studying at NYU. At the time, reboots of fairy tales weren't a popular film genre and, according to Daugherty, "no one really knew what to do with it." More problems came when the release of Terry Gilliam's The Brothers Grimm (2005) flopped at the box office which caused potential buyers to be hesitant about the script. The script was finally greenlit after the success of Tim Burton's Alice in Wonderland (2010).

Casting

Film producers considered casting a lesser-known actress for the role of Snow White, with mention of Riley Keough, Felicity Jones, Bella Heathcote, Alicia Vikander, and Rachel Maxwell as possible picks. This idea became less likely as known actresses Dakota Fanning and Kristen Stewart were later rumored to be short-listed for the role. On March 4, 2011 co-producer Palak Patel confirmed that Stewart was offered the role. Winona Ryder was initially considered to play Queen Ravenna, before the role went to Charlize Theron. Tom Hardy was supposedly first offered the role of Eric, the Huntsman, but turned down the offer. The role was then apparently offered to Michael Fassbender, and then Johnny Depp, but both claim to have declined it. Viggo Mortensen was said to have been in negotiations with Universal for the part, but supposedly turned down the role, too. It was claimed that Hugh Jackman was offered the role, but that he declined. In 2011, Thor star Chris Hemsworth was eventually cast in the role of the Huntsman.

Filming

Principal photography took place in the United Kingdom. Most indoor scenes were shot at Pinewood Studios. The beach scenes were predominantly filmed in Pembrokeshire, Wales, on the Marloes Sands beach near the village of Marloes between September 26 and 29, 2011. Though the beach was not closed to the public during filming, as filming progressed, certain parts were advised to be off limits. A computer-generated castle was set on nearby Gateholm island. A field above the beach was used for production purposes, and a special wooden ramp was built for vehicles and horses to access the beach. Filming also took place at Frensham Small Pond. The film used academic consultants from the University of Chichester and the University of Oxford for back-up research on fairy tales and medieval battles.

Music
James Newton Howard composed the music for the film. The English band Florence and the Machine recorded "Breath of Life" exclusively for the film, which was reportedly inspired by Theron's character Queen Ravenna. Ioanna Gika of Io Echo performed "Gone", a song that is played at Gus's funeral in the film.

Release
The film had its premiere on May 14, 2012, at the Empire, Leicester Square, in London. The film was released on DVD and Blu-ray in Region 1 on September 11, 2012, with both the theatrical version (127 minutes) and an extended version (132 minutes) available on both formats. The film was released on the same formats in Region 2 on October 1, 2012.

A book based on the film was published June 5, 2012

Reception

Box office

Snow White and the Huntsman earned $155.3 million in North America, along with $241.3 million in other territories, for a worldwide total of $396.6 million. In North America, the film earned $1.38 million from midnight showings. For its opening day, the film topped the box office with $7.5 million. It debuted in first place at the box office during its opening weekend with $14.2 million. It is the seventeenth highest-grossing 2012 film. Outside North America, Snow White and the Huntsman had an opening of $39.3 million, ranking second overall for the weekend behind Men in Black 3; however, it ranked number 1 in 30 countries.

Critical response

Snow White and the Huntsman received mixed reviews from critics. The site's consensus states: "While it offers an appropriately dark take on the fairy tale that inspired it, Snow White & the Huntsman is undone by uneven acting, problematic pacing, and a confused script." On Metacritic, the film has a score of 57 out of 100, based on 39 critics, indicating "mixed or average reviews". CinemaScore polls conducted revealed the average grade that filmgoers gave the film was a "B" on an A+ to F scale.

David Edelstein of New York praised the film's revisionist tone and said the film was "strongly influenced by a lot of smart, feminist thinking". Roger Ebert gave the film 3.5 stars out of 4. A.O. Scott of The New York Times praised Theron's performance and also wrote, "Though it is an ambitious – at times mesmerizing – application of the latest cinematic technology, the movie tries to recapture some of the menace of the stories that used to be told to scare children rather than console them." Owen Gleiberman of Entertainment Weekly wrote, "Ravenna hates living in a world where men can feed on women's beauty and then toss them away. She's a fascist of feminism, and Theron's acting has the blood of operatic anger coursing through it." Betsy Sharkey of the Los Angeles Times said the film is, "an absolute wonder to watch and creates a warrior princess for the ages. But what this revisionist fairy tale does not give us is a passionate love – its kisses are as chaste as the snow is white." Rolling Stones Peter Travers called it "a visual marvel" while noting that Stewart "morphs convincingly from a skittish girl into a determined warrior princess." MSN news said that Stewart "grows into her character, it seems, and eventually got this reviewer completely on her side." Colin Covert of the Minneapolis Star Tribune gave the film 4/4 stars. Richard Roeper of the Chicago Sun-Times gave the movie a B+, calling it "Vastly superior to Mirror, Mirror", and praising Theron and Stewart's performances.

Peter Bradshaw of The Guardian said that while the film is "less jokey than the recent Mirror Mirror", "this Twilightified fairytale has the same basic problem," and that, "The result is tangled and overblown." Mick LaSalle of the San Francisco Chronicle called it "[a] slow, boring film that has no charm and is highlighted only by a handful of special effects and Charlize Theron's truly evil queen." Michael O'Sullivan of The Washington Post also gave the film a negative review: "Overlong, overcrowded, overstimulating and with an over-the-top performance by Charlize Theron as the evil queen Ravenna, the movie is a virtual orchard of toxic excess, starting with the unnecessarily sprawling cast of characters." Lisa Kennedy of The Denver Post gave the film two out of four stars and said, "Only Bob Hoskins as the blind seer Muir comes close to making us care. We can almost glean Snow White's heroic possibilities through his clouded eyes. As much as we'd like to, we certainly can't from Stewart's efforts." Film Comments Scott Foundas states that "Stewart’s Snow White... pouts her lips, bats her bedroom eyes, and scarcely seems to have more on her mind than who might take her to the senior prom—let alone the destiny of an entire kingdom."

Accolades

Sequel 

A sequel was planned, with director Rupert Sanders in talks to return. In August 2012, The Hollywood Reporter reported that the sequel was shelved in the aftermath of the scandal involving Sanders cheating on his wife with Stewart and that a spin-off film concentrating on the Huntsman was planned instead, which would not star Stewart. Universal announced a few days later that they were not shelving the sequel. A 2012 report stated that Universal has authorized a sequel and Stewart was set to reprise her role, but without Sanders to return as the director due to the scandal. The script was written and production was set to begin in 2013.

The film was originally scheduled for release in 2015. In September 2013, Chris Hemsworth stated he did not know anything about the sequel while speaking to E!. On June 4, 2014, Deadline reported that Frank Darabont, Gavin O'Connor and Andrés Muschietti were on the shortlist to direct the sequel. On June 26, 2014, Deadline reported that Darabont was in talks to direct the sequel.  Originally Legendary Pictures was set to co-finance the film with Universal but dropped out and were replaced by Perfect World Pictures. On July 31, 2014, the project was described as a prequel titled The Huntsman scheduled for April 22, 2016, which would not star Stewart as Snow White. In January 2015, Darabont left the project as director, but the third leading role was set with Emily Blunt. It was later announced that Cedric Nicolas-Troyan would take over as the new director for the film. Nick Frost would return as Dwarf Nion and Jessica Chastain would star. On March 18, 2015, Rob Brydon, Alexandra Roach and Sheridan Smith were added to the cast as dwarves. TheWrap confirmed on May 7, 2015, that Sam Claflin would return as William in this sequel.

It was later revealed that the film would feature Ravenna's sister, the Ice Queen, and would reveal the origins of the Huntsman, while also continuing the story of the first film.

The film, which is both a prequel and a sequel, was released in 2016 as The Huntsman: Winter's War.

See also

 Snow White, an upcoming film based on the 1937 animated film, starring Rachel Zegler as Snow White and Gal Gadot as the Evil Queen.
 Mirror Mirror, another 2012 film based on the tale of Snow White, starring Lily Collins as Snow White and Julia Roberts as Queen Clementianna, Snow White's evil stepmother.
 Maleficent, similar dark/modern take on an old fairy tale

References

External links
 
 
 
 

2012 films
2012 fantasy films
Films scored by James Newton Howard
Films based on Snow White
Films directed by Rupert Sanders
Films produced by Joe Roth
Films produced by Sam Mercer
Films set in castles
Films set in Europe
Films set in the Middle Ages
Films shot at Pinewood Studios
Films shot in Wales
Films shot in England
Mariticide in fiction
Films using motion capture
Golden Raspberry Award winning films
Films with screenplays by Hossein Amini
Films with screenplays by Evan Daugherty
Films about witchcraft
Universal Pictures films
Casting controversies in film
Film controversies
Films with screenplays by John Lee Hancock
2012 directorial debut films
2010s English-language films